Woking Hockey Club is a field hockey club based in Woking, Surrey, England. The home ground is situated in Goldsworth Park, about one mile (1.6 km) from Woking town centre. The club has two sand dressed astro-turf pitches. Next to the pitches is a Club House that contains a cafe, toilets and changing rooms. The club is one of the largest hockey clubs in the country.

The men's 1st XI play in South Premier Div 2. The ladies' 1st XI play in South Division 2. The club fields nine men's teams and six ladies' teams as well as a thriving Juniors section. The club is accredited by England Hockey's Clubs First Scheme.

Badge

The club's badge are a purple and red hockey stick crossed, with the Woking coat of arms on the left and a bird (possibly a Dove) on the right side. Above and below the badge 'Woking H.C.' is written in gold lettering.

External links
 Woking Hockey Club website
South League Premier Division 2 https://www.south-league.com/fixtures/league/prem12/2018-2019

English field hockey clubs
Sport in Surrey
Woking